1/12 may refer to:
January 12 (month-day date notation)
December 1 (day-month date notation)
January 12 AD (month-year date notation)
1 AD December (year-month date notation)
1st Battalion, 12th Marines, an artillery battalion of the United States Marine Corps
1/12 or 1:12 scale
Maximum slope of a wheelchair ramp under regulations in several countries

See also

 1 (disambiguation)
 12 (disambiguation)
 112 (disambiguation)
 11/2 (disambiguation)
 12/1 (disambiguation)
 121 (disambiguation)